Dardamel-e Hoseynali (also Romanized as Dārdamel-e Ḩoseyn‘alī) is a village in Afrineh Rural District, Mamulan District, Pol-e Dokhtar County, Lorestan Province, Iran. At the time of the 2006 census, its population was 36 and included six families.

References 

Towns and villages in Pol-e Dokhtar County